Our House is an American drama television series that aired on NBC for two seasons from September 11, 1986 to May 8, 1988. The series centers on the Witherspoon family and the challenges they face adjusting to life with three generations living in the same house.

The series was created by James Lee Barrett, who died the year after its cancellation.

Synopsis 
After his son John dies, retired widower Gus Witherspoon (Wilford Brimley) invites his daughter-in-law Jessica Witherspoon (Deidre Hall) and her three children to move to Los Angeles and live with him until Jessie gets back on her feet financially.

Despite protests from her children—15-year-old daughter Kris (Shannen Doherty); 12-year-old son David (Chad Allen); and 8-year-old daughter Molly (Keri Houlihan)—they, Jessie, and their basset hound Arthur leave Fort Wayne, Indiana, to start life anew in California. As they settle in with Gus, they realize just how difficult he can be to live with. The majority of the plots each week centers on the conflicts which tend to arise when an extended family must live together in the same house. As man of the house, Gus imposes rules on his three grandkids the same way he had raised John (and also John's brother Ben, who is seen in a two-part episode); ultimately, however, he learns ways of conveying lessons to the kids without being gruff. Jessie and the kids eventually learn that beneath Gus's stern facade is a wise man, well versed in the ways of the world, who cares about them very much.

Each of the episode's five acts (before the commercial break) ends with a freeze-frame shot which then occupies one of several rooms in an abstract rendering of a house figure. As the episode unfolds, more rooms are filled until finally—when the dilemma has been resolved—the final piece is put in place, completing the house.

John Witherspoon (played by Patrick Duffy) is seen in one episode and in the occasional flashback.

Cast 
Wilford Brimley as Gus Witherspoon
Deidre Hall as Jessica "Jessie" Witherspoon
Shannen Doherty as Kris Witherspoon
Chad Allen as David Witherspoon
Keri Houlihan as Molly Witherspoon
Gerald S. O'Loughlin as Joe Kaplan

Episodes

Season 1 (1986–87)

Season 2 (1987–88)

Reception 
Upon the show's 1986 premiere, the Associated Press called it "a family show suitable for framing." Despite positive reviews, the series was not a ratings success in spite of a promising start, likely owing to being scheduled Sundays at 7 PM (EST) opposite CBS's powerhouse 60 Minutes and numerous overruns by NFL games on its own network.  The series ranked 59th in its first season (12.9 rating)  and 71st in its second season (10.9 rating).

The Inspiration Network re-aired the show in the US from October 18, 2010, to December 31, 2011. Prior to that, reruns of the show aired on The Family Channel in the early 1990s and on the Faith & Values Channel, Pax TV and Odyssey Channel later that decade.

References

External links
 
 
 

1986 American television series debuts
1988 American television series endings
1980s American drama television series
English-language television shows
NBC original programming
Television series by Lorimar Television
Television shows set in Los Angeles
Television series by Lorimar-Telepictures